A capirote is a Catholic pointed hat of conical form that is used in Spain and Hispanic countries by members of a confraternity of penitents. It is part of the uniform of such brotherhoods including the Nazarenos and Fariseos during Easter observances and reenactments in some areas during Holy Week in Spain and its former colonies, though similar hoods are common in other Christian countries such as Italy. Capirote are worn by penitents so that attention is not drawn towards themselves as they repent, but instead to God.

History
Historically, the flagellants are the origin of the current traditions, as they flogged themselves with a discipline to do penance. Pope Clement VI ordered that flagellants could perform penance only under control of the church; he decreed Inter sollicitudines ("inner concerns" for suppression). This is considered one of the reasons why flagellants often hid their faces.

The use of the capirote or coroza was prescribed in Spain by the holy office of Inquisition. Men and women who were arrested had to wear a paper capirote in public as sign of public humiliation. The capirote was worn during the session of an Auto-da-fé. The colour was different, conforming to the judgement of the office. People who were condemned to be executed wore a red coroza. Other punishments used different colours.

When the Inquisition was abolished, the symbol of punishment and penitence was kept in the Catholic brotherhood, however, the capirotes used today are different; they are covered in fine fabric, as prescribed by the brotherhood.  To this day, they are still worn during the celebration of the Holy Week/Easter most notably in Andalusia, by penitentes (who perform public penance for their sins) who walk through streets with the capirote.

The usage of the capirote during the Holy Week was once common throughout Spain's colonies, but this custom has since died out in most of them by the late 19th century. Notable exceptions to this are some parts of Mexico and Guatemala. Similar hoods are common in other Christian countries such as Italy. 

The capirote is today the symbol of the Catholic penitent: only members of a confraternity of penance are allowed to wear them during solemn processions. Children can receive the capirote after their first holy communion, when they enter the brotherhood.

Fabric 
Historically the design is called the capirote, but the brotherhoods cover it with fabric together with their face, and the medal of the brotherhood that is worn underneath. The cloth has two holes for the penitent to see through. The insignia or crest of the brotherhood is usually embroidered on the capirote in fine gold.

The capirote is worn during the whole penance.

Use outside of the Catholic Church 
According to historian Michael K. Jerryson, the capirote was appropriated by the early 20th-century American Ku Klux Klan, a white supremacist and anti-Catholic group. However, Alison Kinney of New Republic traces the uniform to Southern Mardi Gras celebrations, therefore only indirectly related to the capirote.

Gallery

See also

 
 List of headgear
 Sanbenito

References

14th-century Christianity
Holy Week in Spain
Catholic religious clothing
Spanish clothing
Spanish Inquisition
Pointed hats